555 Collins Street is a site located on the corner of Collins and King Street in the Melbourne CBD. Enterprise House, an office building that replaced the Second Empire Federal Coffee Palace, has been demolished for redevelopment into a 85,000sqm two stage office development.

In October 2018 Charter Hall, an Australian property investment group, bought the site; they plan to build two office buildings in conjunction with the adjoining 55 King Street property, which they already owned. Demolition of Enterprise House began in May 2019, and permission to build the two towers, the first to have 34 levels, was granted in April 2020.

In December 2020, Charter Hall announced that it had secured Amazon as a major pre-commitment tenant and commenced construction of the new office tower.  The new office tower is due for completion in mid 2023.

Enterprise House, a 24-storey modernist concrete office building, replaced the Federal Coffee Palace on the site in 1973; the demolition galvanised preservationists in Melbourne. By the second decade of the 21st century it had become dilapidated and was eventually vacated. Harry Stamoulis, a Melbourne developer, gained special planning permission from Victorian Planning Minister Matthew Guy for a replacement building which would cast shadow on the bank of the Yarra River. In 2013 he proposed an office tower 82 storeys and more than 400 metres tall, which would have been one of the tallest buildings in the world, but in 2014 he sold the property to Fragrance Group, a development company controlled by Singaporean Koh Wee Meng. Fragrance Group proposed a 302-metre, 82-floor mixed-use building containing apartments, offices, and a hotel, which was rejected by the new Planning Minister, Richard Wynne. After unsuccessfully offering the property for sale, in 2016 they gained planning permission for a 160-metre, 47-floor apartment tower sheathed in glass, designed by Bates Smart.

See also
 Architecture of Melbourne

References

External links
 Charter Hall project page

Office buildings in Melbourne